The St-Gabriel-de-Brandon Montagnards are a Junior "A" ice hockey team from Saint-Gabriel-de-Brandon, Quebec, Canada.  They are a part of the Quebec Junior Hockey League.

History
The Sainte-Agathe Montagnards were added to the Quebec Junior AAA Hockey League for the 2008-09 season.

The Montagnards began play in September 2008.

They moved to Saint-Gabriel-De-Brandon following the 2016-17 season. During the 2018 off season, the team acquired a new owner, new team colors and a new name for the 2018-19 season,

Season-by-season results

External links
Montagnards homepage
QJAAAHL Webpage

Ligue de Hockey Junior AAA Quebec teams
Sainte-Agathe-des-Monts